Sathya Sundharam is a 1981 Indian Tamil-language film, directed by Kommineni Seshagiri Rao. The film stars Sivaji Ganesan, K. R. Vijaya, Jai Ganesh and Suruli Rajan. It is a remake of Telugu film Tayaramma Bangarayya.

Plot 
A couple, Satya (K. R. Vijaya) and Sundaram (Sivaji Ganesan), offer their services to help resolve disputes for numerous people. They confront issues plaguing two families and at the climax their motives for offering their services are revealed. The film ends with both families living happily, and Satya and Sundaram go in search of other families having disputes.

Cast 
 Sivaji Ganesan as Sundaram
 K. R. Vijaya as Sathya
 Jai Ganesh
 Suruli Rajan
 V. K. Ramasamy
 V. S. Raghavan
 Vijayakumar as Madhu
 Sripriya as Vani
 Madhavi as Lakshmi
 Anuradha

Soundtrack 
Soundtrack was composed by M. S. Viswanathan and the songs were penned by Kannadasan .
T. M.

References

External links 
 

1981 films
Indian drama films
Films scored by M. S. Viswanathan
1980s Tamil-language films
Tamil remakes of Telugu films
Films directed by Kommineni Seshagiri Rao